The Škoda Fabia Rally2 evo is a rally car built by Škoda Motorsport. It is an upgraded generational update of the original Fabia R5, based on the facelifted Škoda Fabia production car. After four years of success in the R5 discipline with the original Fabia, Škoda announced the Fabia R5 evo at the Geneva Motor Show in March 2019. The car was showcased as an improvement over the 2015 Fabia in nearly all areas, most notably the power and response of the engine. After many kilometers of testing, The Evo passed international homologation on the 1st of April 2019, and made its competitive rallying debut in the hands of Jan Kopecký at the third round of the Czech Rally Championship, Rallye Český Krumlov. The car would make a successful first impression, winning the rally overall. Soon after it would make its World Rally Championship debut at Rally de Portugal, where it would once again emerge victorious in the hands of Kalle Rovanperä.

Rally Victories

World Championships

World Rally Championship-2 Pro

World Rally Championship-2

World Rally Championship-3

Regional championships

European Rally Championship victories

Notes

References

External links

  
 Car specification
 Škoda Fabia Rally2 evo at eWRC-results.com

2010s cars
All-wheel-drive vehicles
Cars introduced in 2019
Cars of the Czech Republic
R5 cars
Rally2 cars
Fabia R5